The Battle of Kütahya–Eskişehir, was fought between July 10 and July 24 (or June 27 and July 10 in the old calendar, then in use in Greece), 1921 when the Greek Army of Asia Minor clashed with the Turkish troops commanded by İsmet Pasha in defence of the line of Kara Hisâr-ı Sahib (present day Afyonkarahisar)-Kütahya-Eskişehir. 

It was also known in some Greek historiography as the Battles of Kutahya-Dorylaion. It was part of the Greek Asia Minor Campaign and the Turkish War of Independence of 1919–1922.

Strategically, the battle was of little importance as the Greeks failed to grasp the opportunity to encircle the retreating Turkish troops. This proved later to be a major strategic error, when the two sides had to meet each other again during the much more fierce Battle of Sakarya which turned the tide in favour of the Turks.

The battle
After their halt in the second Battle of Inonu, the Greek staff decided to make a new offense to capture the cities of Afyonkarahisar, Kütahya and Eskişehir with their inter-connecting rail-lines. King Constantine arrived in Anatolia to inspire the soldiers and to command the attack.

The Greek Army managed to break through the Turkish resistance and occupied the towns of Kara Hisâr-ı Sahib (in March), and later (in July) Kütahya and Eskişehir (Dorylaion in Greek), together with their inter-connecting rail-lines.

The Turks despite their defeat managed to avoid encirclement and made a strategic retreat on the east of Sakarya river. On August 5, 1921 İsmet Pasha was replaced by Birinci Ferik Fevzi Pasha as the Minister of the General Staff (Erkân-ı Harbiye-i Umumiye Reis Vekili) of the Ankara government after his failure to check the Greek offensive.

The State and Greek army leadership, including King Constantine, Prime Minister Dimitrios Gounaris, and General Anastasios Papoulas, met at Kütahya where they debated the future of the campaign. The Greeks with rejuvenated their morale failed to appraise rationally the strategic situation that favoured the defending side; instead, in the overall climate of enthusiasm, the leadership was polarised into the risky decision to pursue an engagement with the Turks on their last line of defence, close to Ankara. Only few voices supported a defensive stance, but they were not heard.

After a delay of almost a month, that gave adequate time to the Turks to organise their defences, 7 of the Greek divisions marched to Sakarya River.

References

Notes

Kutahya-Eskisehir
1921 in the Ottoman Empire
1921 in Greece
Conflicts in 1921
Hüdavendigâr vilayet
History of Afyonkarahisar
History of Eskişehir
History of Kütahya
July 1921 events
Battles of İsmet İnönü